SoloTürk or Solo Türk, often stylized as SOLOTÜRK, is a single-aircraft aerobatic demonstration team of the Turkish Air Force. Plans for the team began in November 2009 and the pilot training process was finalized in August 2010 with three pilots initially. The first demonstration flight was performed within the military in September 2010, and the team made its first public appearance 15 April 2011. Since then, SoloTürk has  participated in several national and international airshows, with most maneuvers in demonstration flights being special to the team.

The team uses a specially-painted General Dynamics F-16C Block 40 aircraft which is combat ready. SoloTürk formerly operated out of the Akıncı Air Base, but moved to Konya Air Base in 2016 after the coup d'état attempt. The team has a total of 13 personnel, including two pilots, and uses a CASA CN-235M-100 for transportation. Pilots wanting to fly for the team must meet certain criteria before they qualify for a training. SoloTürk has received multiple awards for its demonstration flights.

History 

The development of a one-aircraft aerobatic team started on 25 November 2009. The pilots were selected in January 2010 and training started in May the same year, which lasted three months. The first display flight was performed on 1 September 2010 to then Turkish Air Force commander Hasan Aksay at the 4th Main Base Jet Command, where the team was stationed until 2016.

The team made its first public appearance on 15 April 2011 at the Akıncı Air Base in Ankara during the 100th anniversary event of the Turkish Air Force. At the final Waddington International Air Show in 2014, SoloTürk ducked under the glide slope on final approach and made an extremely low-pass above the audience watching the aircraft land.

The Akıncı Air Base, which was the base of SoloTürk since its forming, was closed following the 2016 Turkish coup d'état attempt as it is alleged that the base was used as the command center of pro-coup military. An internal investigation concluded that none of the members of SoloTürk were a part of the Gülen movement. The base of the team was moved to the Konya Air Base in October 2016, where the aerobatic demonstration team Turkish Stars are also based at.

At the inaugural Teknofest on 20 September 2018, a drag race was held between SoloTürk, Red Bull RB8, Kawasaki Ninja H2, Tesla Model S P100D, Aston Martin Vantage, Lotus Evora GT410 and Bombardier Challenger 600. The 9-second race was won by Kenan Sofuoğlu who was driving the Kawasaki Ninja H2. SoloTürk came third behind the Red Bull RB8 driven by Jake Dennis. Before the start of the 2020 Turkish Grand Prix at the Istanbul Park circuit, SoloTürk made a fly-by on the main straight. A footage captured by a track-side cameraman showed that the unexpected and sudden sound of the aircraft scared several drivers without headphones.

On 21 May 2022, pilot Emre Mert performed the cobra maneuver with the demonstration aircraft. With this, SoloTürk became the first team to perform this maneuver with a General Dynamics F-16.

Demonstrations 
A typical SoloTürk demonstration flight takes about 20 minutes, where the pilot makes 20 maneuvers. According to Erhan Günar, one of the former pilots of the team, most of these are only performed by SoloTürk. The aircraft performs a aileron roll while climbing and turning. The move is performed across three axes and is nicknamed SoloTürk roll because it is only performed by SoloTürk. In 2022, the cobra maneuver was also added to the demonstration package of the team. Per demonstration flight, 3.5tonnes of fuel is used. Pilots experience a maximum g-force of 9 during flights.

Aircraft

Demonstration aircraft 

SoloTürk uses a General Dynamics F-16C Block 40 aircraft in its demonstration flights. The type was chosen because it is a highly maneuverable aircraft and because the F-16 uses a side-stick, which aids pilots in keeping the aircraft under control during high g-force maneuvers. Despite being painted in a special livery, the aircraft still has combat capabilities and is sometimes used in training and minor operations carried out by the Turkish Air Force.

The livery was designed by Murat Dorkip. The star and crescent on the aircraft represents the value of the Turkish Air Force to the Republic of Turkey. The silver star on the plane symbolizes the goal of the Republic of Turkey and the Turkish Air Force to be the star of the 21st century, while the golden hawk on the tail symbolizes the freedom and determination in the spirit of the aviators. According to former SoloTürk pilot Erhan Günar, the black stripes found on the aircraft symbolize "how accurate and fast the Turkish Air Force and Turkish Armed Forces make their decisions".

Transport aircraft 
Initially, the team used a CASA CN-235M-100 as its transport aircraft. In 2016, this aircraft was replaced by a Lockheed C-130 Hercules with serial number 63-13187. In October 2020, the team returned to using a CASA CN-235.

Organization

Selection and training 

On 25 November 2009, the Turkish Air Force Command started the Flight with a Single F-16 Aircraft program to find pilots. Three pilots were selected on 14 January 2010: Murat Keleş, Fatih Batmaz and Sedat Yalın Ahbab. On 18 May 2010, Keleş became the first of the three to start his training. During training sessions, two additional pilots were present in the cockpit as observers. Keleş finished his training on 20 August 2010.

In an early 2021 interview with TRT Haber, pilot Emre Mert said that to become a SoloTürk pilot, "you must have flown an F-16 for over 500 hours, have no record of incidents and know a good level of English." Pilots can only start their training of three months which they will have to pass, after they meet these criteria and get selected. Later that year, pilot Murat Bakıcı told that there were specific "books and guidelines" on who could become a pilot, and said that the minimum required flight hours was one thousand.

Personnel 
As of November 2019, the team consists of two pilots, two support personnel and nine maintenance personnel. The person talking during the demonstration flights is SoloTürk's press and public relations officer, Mustafa Bircan Biçer. The three initially selected pilots are no longer a part of SoloTürk. Murat Keleş left in 2012, Fatih Batmaz in 2013, while Sedat Yalın Ahbab left in 2014. As of January 2022, the two incumbent pilots flying the aircraft are Emre Mert and Murat Bakıcı. Apart from demonstration flights, the pilots also participate in regular military missions of the Turkish Air Force.

Awards 
SoloTürk received its first award on 18 July 2011 at the Royal International Air Tattoo for having the "Best Demonstration Flight" of the airshow. In August 2017, the team received the same award at the Slovak International Air Fest, where the demonstration flight was watched by 300.000 people. At the Royal International Air Tattoo in 2018, the team received an award for having the "Best Solo Jet Demonstration Flight" of the airshow.

References

External links 

 

Turkish Air Force
Aerobatic teams
Konya Province
2011 establishments in Turkey
Military units and formations established in 2011